Alberich Glacier is a small glacier that drains west from Junction Knob toward the east flank of Sykes Glacier, in the Asgard Range, Victoria Land, Antarctica. It is one in a group of features in the range named by New Zealand Antarctic Place-Names Committee mainly from Norse mythology. In German legend, Alberich is the all-powerful king of the dwarfs and chief of the Nibelungen.

See also
 List of glaciers in the Antarctic
 Glaciology

References

Glaciers of the Asgard Range
Glaciers of Scott Coast